Karen Keskulla Uhlenbeck (born August 24, 1942) is an American mathematician and one of the founders of modern geometric analysis. She is a professor emeritus of mathematics at the University of Texas at Austin, where she held the Sid W. Richardson Foundation Regents Chair. She is currently a distinguished visiting professor at the Institute for Advanced Study and a visiting senior research scholar at Princeton University.

Uhlenbeck was elected to the American Philosophical Society in 2007. She won the 2019 Abel Prize for "her pioneering achievements in geometric partial differential equations, gauge theory, and integrable systems, and for the fundamental impact of her work on analysis, geometry and mathematical physics." She is the first, and so far only, woman to win the prize since its inception in 2003. She donated half of the prize money to organizations which promote more engagement of women in research mathematics.

Life and career 
Uhlenbeck was born in Cleveland, Ohio, to engineer Arnold Keskulla and schoolteacher and artist Carolyn Windeler Keskulla. While she was a child, the family moved to New Jersey. Uhlenbeck's  maiden name, Keskulla, comes from Keskküla and from her grandfather who was Estonian. Uhlenbeck received her B.A. (1964) from the University of Michigan. She began her graduate studies at the Courant Institute of Mathematical Sciences at New York University, and married biophysicist Olke C. Uhlenbeck (the son of physicist George Uhlenbeck) in 1965. When her husband went to Harvard, she moved with him and restarted her studies at Brandeis University, where she earned an MA (1966) and PhD (1968) under the supervision of Richard Palais. Her doctoral dissertation was titled The Calculus of Variations and Global Analysis.

After temporary jobs at the Massachusetts Institute of Technology and University of California, Berkeley, and having difficulty finding a permanent position with her husband because of the "anti-nepotism" rules then in place that prevented hiring both a husband and wife even in distinct departments of a university, she took a faculty position at the University of Illinois at Urbana–Champaign in 1971. However, she disliked Urbana and moved to the University of Illinois at Chicago in 1976 as well as separating from her first husband Olke Uhlenbeck in the same year. She moved again to the University of Chicago in 1983. In 1988, by which time she had married mathematician Robert F. Williams, she moved to the University of Texas at Austin as the Sid W. Richardson Foundation Regents Chairholder. Uhlenbeck is currently a professor emeritus at the University of Texas at Austin, a visiting associate at the Institute for Advanced Study and a visiting senior research scholar at Princeton University.

Research 
Uhlenbeck is one of the founders of the field of geometric analysis, a discipline that uses differential geometry to study the solutions to differential equations and vice versa. She has also contributed to topological quantum field theory and integrable systems.

Together with Jonathan Sacks in the early 1980s, Uhlenbeck established regularity estimates that have found applications to studies of the singularities of harmonic maps and the existence of smooth local solutions to the Yang–Mills–Higgs equations in gauge theory. In particular, Simon Donaldson describes their joint 1981 paper The existence of minimal immersions of 2-spheres as a "landmark paper... which showed that, with a deeper analysis, variational arguments can still be used to give general existence results" for harmonic map equations.
Building on these ideas, Uhlenbeck initiated a systematic study of the moduli theory of minimal surfaces in hyperbolic 3-manifolds (also called minimal submanifold theory) in her 1983 paper, Closed minimal surfaces in hyperbolic 3-manifolds.

In particular, her work is described by Simon Donaldson in a survey of Yang–Mills geometry as foundational in the analytic aspects of the calculus of variations associated with the Yang–Mills functional. A wider survey of her contributions to the field of calculus of variations was published by Simon Donaldson in the March 2019 issue of Notices of the American Mathematical Society; Donaldson describes the work of Uhlenbeck, along with Shing-Tung Yau, Richard Schoen and several others, as developing a...

Outreach 
In 1991, Uhlenbeck co-founded, with Herbert Clemens and Dan Freed, the Park City Mathematics Institute (PCMI) with the mission to "provide an immersive educational and professional development opportunity for several parallel communities from across the larger umbrella of the mathematics profession." Uhlenbeck also co-founded the Women and Mathematics Program at the Institute for Advanced Study "with the mission to recruit and retain more women in mathematics." British theoretical physicist and author Jim Al-Khalili describes Uhlenbeck as a "role model" for her work in promoting a career in mathematics to young people, particularly women.

Personal life 
Uhlenbeck is a self-described "messy reader" and "messy thinker", with boxes of books stacked on her desk at Princeton's Institute for Advanced Study. In spontaneous remarks made to Institute colleagues after winning the Abel Prize in March 2019, Uhlenbeck noted that for lack of prominent female role models during her apprenticeship in the field of mathematics, she had instead emulated chef Julia Child: "She knew how to pick the turkey up off the floor and serve it".

Awards and honors 
In March 2019, Uhlenbeck became the first woman to receive the Abel Prize, with the award committee citing the decision for "her pioneering achievements in geometric partial differential equations, gauge theory and integrable systems, and for the fundamental impact of her work on analysis, geometry and mathematical physics." Hans Munthe-Kaas, who chaired the award committee, stated that "Her theories have revolutionised our understanding of minimal surfaces, such as more general minimisation problems in higher dimensions".  She donated half of the cash prize to two organizations, the EDGE Foundation (which subsequently set up the Karen EDGE Fellowship Program), and the Institute for Advanced Study's Women and Mathematics (WAM) Program.

Uhlenbeck also won the National Medal of Science in 2000, and the Leroy P. Steele Prize for Seminal Contribution to Research of the American Mathematical Society in 2007, "for her foundational contributions in analytic aspects of mathematical gauge theory", based on her 1982 papers "Removable singularities in Yang–Mills fields" and "Connections with bounds on curvature". She became a MacArthur Fellow in 1983 and a Fellow of the American Academy of Arts and Sciences in 1985. She was elected as a member of the National Academy of Sciences in 1986. She became a Guggenheim Fellow in 2001,
an honorary member of the London Mathematical Society in 2008, and a Fellow of the American Mathematical Society in 2012.

The Association for Women in Mathematics included her in the 2020 class of AWM Fellows for "her groundbreaking and profound contributions to modern geometric analysis; for establishing a career as one of the greatest mathematicians of our time, despite the considerable challenges facing women when she entered the field; for using her experiences navigating these challenges to create and sustain programs to address them for future generations of women. For a lifetime of breaking barriers; and for being the first woman to win the Abel Prize".

She was the Noether Lecturer of the Association for Women in Mathematics in 1988. In 1990, she was a plenary speaker at the International Congress of Mathematicians, as only the second woman (after Emmy Noether) to give such a lecture.

Her other awards include the University of Michigan alumna of the year (1984), the Sigma Xi Common Wealth Award for Science and Technology (1995), and honorary doctorates from the University of Illinois at Urbana–Champaign (2000), Ohio State University (2001), University of Michigan (2004), Harvard University (2007), and Princeton University (2012).

Selected publications

Books

Research articles

See also 
 Timeline of women in mathematics
 Timeline of women in science

References

Further reading

External links 

 https://mathshistory.st-andrews.ac.uk/Biographies/Uhlenbeck_Karen/
 https://scientificwomen.net/women/karen-uhlenbeck-130

1942 births
20th-century American mathematicians
20th-century women mathematicians
21st-century American mathematicians
21st-century women mathematicians
Abel Prize laureates
American people of Estonian descent
American women mathematicians
Brandeis University alumni
Courant Institute of Mathematical Sciences alumni
Fellows of the American Mathematical Society
Fellows of the American Academy of Arts and Sciences
Fellows of the Association for Women in Mathematics
Living people
MacArthur Fellows
Members of the United States National Academy of Sciences
National Medal of Science laureates
People from Cleveland
University of Chicago faculty
University of Illinois Chicago faculty
University of Illinois Urbana-Champaign faculty
University of Michigan alumni
University of Texas at Austin faculty
21st-century American women